The Chapel of St Nicholas is a small disused Roman Catholic church located in the historic and medieval town of Mdina, Malta.

History
A church dedicated to St Nicholas was already built by 1434. In 1685 a new church was commissioned by Bartolomeo Vella and a new one was built to replace the old medieval church. Plans for the new church are attributed to Lorenzo Gafà though this is not for certain. The church was built in the form of a Greek cross crowned by central dome. The church is mentioned in 1762 in the pastoral visitation made by Bishop Bartolomé Rull. Nowadays the church is no longer in use for religious purposes and is in disrepair.  It houses a number of artifacts from the Metropolitan cathedral, notably the Cathedral's Capella Ardente, which was once used in funerary services of notable people.

References

17th-century Roman Catholic church buildings in Malta
Mdina
National Inventory of the Cultural Property of the Maltese Islands
Roman Catholic chapels in Malta